Fincho is a 1957 Nigerian film by Sam Zebba, and the first Nigerian film to be shot in colour. The film deals with the titular character dealing with industrialization brought to Nigeria by European colonialists, the tension between traditional and innovation, and mechanization's threat to traditional labour.

According to Zebba's self-published autobiography, the film was shot with Nigerian non-professional actors, and Pidgin dialogue dubbed by Nigerian students at the University of California, Los Angeles. The director contacted singer Harry Belafonte, who agreed to record an introduction for the film. The score was written by Alexander Laszlo, including the theme Fincho Song which Zebba wrote, and then sang accompanied by a small Mexican band.

References

External links
Finco at ColonialFilm.org.uk

Nigerian drama films
1957 films
Films shot in Nigeria
Pidgin English-language films
English-language Nigerian films
1950s English-language films